So You Think You Can Dance is an American television dance competition that airs on the Fox network. The first season premiered on July 20, 2005, with Lauren Sánchez in her only season as host, Nigel Lythgoe as the main judge, and  Mary Murphy, Dan Karaty, Mia Michaels and Brian Friedman as most frequent guest judges. Nick Lazzarini was crowned America's Favorite Dancer on October 5, 2005, with 37.7% of the votes.

Auditions

Locations
The main auditions for this season were held in following cities:

Format
Auditioners had one minute to impress the judges. A contestant deemed to be not good enough was sent straight home, otherwise, they were sent to a choreography round. After that, the judges decided the fifty dancers that got through to the Hollywood week.

Minimum age for contestants was 18; maximum was 30.

Hollywood week
Judges: Nigel Lythgoe, Mary Murphy, Dan Karaty, Mia Michaels, Brian Friedman, Alex Da Silva

Hollywood week was held in Hollywood in Los Angeles, California. 25 females and 25 males were invited to participate in the callback auditions. This number was cut down to 8 females and 8 males, a total of 16 dancers that came through to the live shows. Hollywood week included the following rounds, cuts were made at the end:

Finals

Top 16 contestants

Male contestants

Canadian-born McGrath has since become lead choreographer and occasional third judge for So You Think You Can Dance Canada ; he is choreographer for those contestants who are sent to choreography.

Female contestants

Elimination chart

Performance nights

Week 1 (August 17, 2005)
Judges: Brian Friedman, Mia Michaels, Nigel Lythgoe and Dan Karaty
Couple dances:

Bottom 3's solos:

Eliminated:
Sandra Colton
Jonathan "Jonnis" Tannis

Week 2 (August 24, 2005)
Judges: Nigel Lythgoe, Mary Murphy, Dan Karaty and Brian Friedman
Couple dances:

Bottom 3's solos:

Eliminated:
Michelle Brooke
Craig DeRosa

Week 3 (August 31, 2005)
Judges: Mia Michaels, Brian Friedman, Mary Murphy and Nigel Lythgoe
Couple dances:

Bottom 2's solos:

Eliminated:
Snejana "Snow" Urbin
Allan Frias

Week 4 (September 7, 2005)
Judges: Brian Friedman, Mia Michaels, Nigel Lythgoe and Dan Karaty
Couple dances:

Bottom 2's solos:

Eliminated:
Destini Rogers
Ryan Conferido

Week 5 (September 14, 2005)
Judges: Dan Karaty, Nigel Lythgoe, Mary Murphy and Brian Friedman
Couple dances:

Bottom 2's solos:

Eliminated:
Melisa Vella
Artem Chigvintsev

Week 6 (September 21, 2005)
Judges: Mia Michaels, Nigel Lythgoe, Mary Murphy and Dan Karaty
Couple dances:

Top 6's solos:

Eliminated:
Kamilah Barrett
Blake McGrath

Week 7 (September 28, 2005)
Judges: Brian Friedman, Mia Michaels, Nigel Lythgoe, Mary Murphy and Dan Karaty
Duo dances:

Top 4's solos:

Freestyle round: Top 4: "Music"—John Miles

Week 8 (Finale) (October 5, 2005)
Judges: Brian Friedman, Mia Michaels, Nigel Lythgoe, Mary Murphy and Dan Karaty
Group dance: Top 16: "Pump It"—The Black Eyed Peas (Hip-Hop; Choreographer: Shane Sparks)
Guest dancers:

Top 4's favorite routines:

Places:

Ratings

U.S. Nielsen ratings

See also
 List of So You Think You Can Dance finalists

Notes

References

External links
So You Think You Can Dance's Official Website

2005 American television seasons
Season 01